St. Mary's Catholic School or SMCS is a Roman Catholic co-educational school, PreK-8, located in Temple, Texas.

History
St. Mary's School was founded in 1897 under the name of St. Mary's Academy by Father Heckmann, pastor of St. Mary's Church. Under his direction, with the support of a group of parishioners, Divine Providence Sisters guided the pupils for several years. The Divine Providence Sisters withdrew in 1912 and not until 1919 could teaching sisters be found to continue their good work. Sisters of the Congregation of the Incarnate Word and Blessed Sacrament from Houston, Texas, began at St. Mary's School in 1919 and had a presence in the school until the retirement in May 1995 of long-time librarian, Sister James Philip Davison. In 1974, Mrs. Loris Edwards became the first lay principal.

Today, the school is staffed by lay teachers.

Academics
In addition to its emphasis on moral development, St. Mary's prides itself on academics and is a presence at the PSIA tournaments every year.  It has hosted the academic competitions several times at its school. Elementary students study the core subjects of math, English, science, social studies, and religion.  Middle school continues with each of these but also adds Spanish as a core class.  Elementary students do have weekly music, band, Spanish, and technology classes.  Middle school students have electives, which include creative writing, drama, technology, guitar, choir, art 1 and 2, band, bible study, and study hall. Elementary students also have electives such as baking and home ec.

Buildings
The school is divided up into two interwoven campuses, the Reagan campus and the Parish campus.  The Parish campus was the home for the school for 105 years.  The school, because of a rise in its student body, acquired a recently closed down elementary school directly across the street.  This building was Reagan Elementary, and it is now the current home of the school.  Some are still held in the Parish hall, but most activities take place in the Reagan building.  Plans exist to expand the Reagan building even more, for the school is quickly running out of room. Recently added was the new gym for the students located next to the Reagan building. It contains a band hall, gymnasium, and offices.

References

External links
 Official Website

Private K–8 schools in Texas
Schools in Bell County, Texas
Educational institutions established in 1897
1897 establishments in Texas